The men's Nanquan / Nangun all-round competition at the 2018 Asian Games in Jakarta, Indonesia was held from 20 August to 21 August at the JIExpo Kemayoran Hall B3.

Schedule
All times are Western Indonesia Time (UTC+07:00)

Results

References

External links
Official website

Men's nanquan